Heiko Uecker (5 September 1939 – 30 May 2019) was a German philologist who specialized in Germanic studies. He was Professor of Nordic Philology at the University of Bonn and a known expert on Scandinavian literature.

Biography
Heiko Uecker was born in Nuremberg, Germany on 5 September 1939. He received his Ph.D. in 1966 with the thesis Die altnordischen Bestattungssitten in der literarischen Überlieferung, which examined descriptions of Norse funerals in Old Norse literature.

Uecker completed his habilitation in 1977, and subsequently served as a visiting professor at the University of Chicago. In 1982, Uecker was appointed Professor of Nordic Philology at the University of Bonn. He served as Head of the Department of Scandinavian Studies at the University of Bonn.

Uecker specialized in the study of Scandinavian literature. He was an authority on both medieval and modern Scandinavian literature, and also early Germanic literature, on which he was the author of numerous works. He is known for his research on Norwegian authors Henrik Ibsen and Knut Hamsun. He contributed significantly to the improvement of Germany–Norway relations. In 2004, Uecker received both the Willy Brandt Prize and the Royal Norwegian Order of Merit.

Uecker was married to Kari Uecker. He was the father of actor Georg Uecker.

Uecker retired from the University of Bonn in 2004. He died in Bonn on 30 May 2019.

See also
 Heinrich Beck (philologist)
 Heinz Klingenberg (philologist)
 Klaus Böldl
 Klaus von See
 Kurt Schier
 Rudolf Simek
 Arnulf Krause
 Robert Nedoma
 Wilhelm Heizmann

Selected works
 Geschichte der altnordischen Literatur. Stuttgart: Reclam 2004. .
 (mit Joachim Trinkwitz): Die Klassiker der skandinavischen Literatur. Die großen Autoren vom 18. Jahrhundert bis zur Gegenwart. Essen: Meysenburg 2002. . (Überarbeitete Neuauflage der Ausgabe Düsseldorf: Econ 1990.)
 Germanische Heldensage. Stuttgart: Metzler 1972 (=Sammlung Metzler, Bd. 106).

Sources

1939 births
2019 deaths
German philologists
Germanic studies scholars
Ludwig Maximilian University of Munich alumni
Old Norse studies scholars
People from Nuremberg
Academic staff of the University of Bonn